Robert Otis Hicks Jr. (born November 17, 1974) is a former American football offensive lineman in the National Football League (NFL) for the Buffalo Bills from 1998 until 2000.  He played college football at Mississippi State University and was drafted by Buffalo in the third round of the 1998 NFL draft.

References

1974 births
Living people
American football offensive tackles
Buffalo Bills players
Mississippi State Bulldogs football players
Players of American football from Atlanta